This list is of the Cultural Properties of Japan located within the city of Uji in Kyōto Prefecture.

Statistics
As of 20 April 2012, 145 Properties have been designated (including nine *National Treasures) and a further 4 Properties registered. Since a single designation or registration may include more than one item, the total number of assets protected and promoted in accordance with the Law for the Protection of Cultural Properties (1950) exceeds the sum of designations and registrations.

† National Treasures (denoted with an asterisk, smaller text, and brackets) are included within the count of Important Cultural Properties; Monuments designated in more than one class (denoted with brackets) are counted once.

Designated Cultural Properties

Registered Cultural Properties

See also
 Cultural Properties of Japan

References

External links
 Outline of the Cultural Administration of Japan
  Cultural Properties of Uji

Uji, Kyoto